School District 68 Nanaimo-Ladysmith is a school district on central Vancouver Island in British Columbia. This includes the major centres of Nanaimo and Ladysmith. It is also covers the surrounding communities and the adjacent northern Gulf Islands.

History

The Nanaimo School district was formed July 30, 1870.

On Tuesday, July 28, 1942 a shortage of teachers in British Columbia, amongst other factors, resulted in two orders-in-council which resulted in one of the largest amalgamations of school districts undertaken by the Ministry of Education. The resulting school district reached from Saltair to Red Gap, but excluded the Ladysmith and Nanaimo Municipal Areas, which kept their own school districts.  The new school district was called the "Nanaimo-Ladysmith United Rural School District" and was created by uniting the 19 school districts of: Brechin, Cedar North, Cedar South, Cedar East, Chase River, Departure Bay, Extension, Diamond Crossing, Harewood, Lantzville, Mountain, Nanaimo Bay, Northfield, Oyster, North Oyster, Red Gap, Waterloo, Wellington and South Wellington.

In 1945 the Cameron Report on restructuring the administration of public schools resulted in the government passing the Public Schools Act Amendment Act of 1946 which reduced the number of school districts in British Columbia to 74.  This Act further restructured districts in the area.

On April 25, 1972, after years of discussions and financial difficulties, the board of Ladysmith School District (67) voted to merge their district with School District 68 to the North, and School District 65 to the South.

Schools

Island ConnectEd 8–12

Island ConnectEd 8–12 is a School District 68 public school that allows students in grades 8–12 throughout the district to learn in a flexible blended-model of online and face-to-face courses. The program has been in operation since 2006 and is a member of the school district's Learning Alternatives Programs.

Island ConnectEd 8–12 is one of the distributed learning schools made possible by Bill 33. As a distributed learning school, Island ConnectEd 8–12 must meet the same curriculum as other schools in the province plus additional regulations. Students in distributed learning classes must still complete mandatory provincial examinations, in grades 10, 11, and 12.

The school building of Island ConnectEd 8–12 and the K–7 portion of the school are currently located at 4355 Jingle Pot Road, Nanaimo, BC.

School boards

1965:
Trustees:
Chairman:  Trustee William A. Lerch

References

See also
List of school districts in British Columbia

Education in Nanaimo
68